Museum Mile may refer to:

 Museum Mile, London, collective name for museums in the area between King's Cross and River Thames
 Museum Mile, a mile long stretch of Fifth Avenue in New York City where major museums are located

See also
 Museum Island, Berlin
 Miracle Mile, Los Angeles, neighborhood containing Museum Row
 Albertopolis, London
 Exhibition Road, London